The Zimbabwe national rugby sevens team competes in both domestic and international rugby sevens competitions. Zimbabwe competes in World Rugby Sevens Series events such as the South Africa Sevens and Hong Kong Sevens.

The team is nicknamed the Cheetahs. They traditionally play in a green and white strip on Day 1 of tournaments, and then a white and green strip on Day 2. Zimbabwe participated at the 2020 World Rugby Sevens Challenger Series. They also qualified for the 2020 Men's Rugby Sevens Final Olympic Qualification Tournament, but did not qualify for the Tokyo Olympics.

Tournament history

Rugby World Cup Sevens

Africa Sevens

Competition records
 Amsterdam 7s
 2006 - Cup Quarterfinals
 Benidorm 7s
 2005 - Plate Final
 2006 - Cup Semifinals
 Dubai 7s
 1999 - Bowl Final
 2000 - Plate Semifinals
 2003 - Shield Semifinals
 2006 - Bowl Finals
 2007 - Shield Winners
 Durban
 2000 - Bowl Quarterfinals
 George 7s
 2003 - Shield Semifinals
 2005 - Bowl Semifinals
 2006 - Shield Finals
 2010 - Shield Winners
 Hong Kong 7s
 1998 - Bowl Semifinals
 2008 - Bowl Final-Runners Up
 Safari 7s
 2003 - Plate Semifinals
 2006 - Cup Final
 Stellenbosch
 1999 - Bowl Quarterfinals
 Tokyo Sevens
 1997 - First Round
 Tunisia - Monastir
 2018 - African Sevens Champions

Team

Current squad

Players called up to Zimbabwe's 2016 Men's Rugby Sevens Final Olympic Qualification Tournament squad.

Head Coach:  Gilbert Nyamutsamba

Hilton Mudariki (c)
Tafadzwa Chitokwindo
Kuda Chiwanza
Tendai Dzongodza
Takudzwa Francisco
Stephan Hunduza
Takudzwa Kumadiro
Kilvan Magunje
Shayne Makombe
David McWade
Riaan O’Neill
Boyd Rouse
Manasah Sita
Lucky Sithole
Lenience Tambwera
Biselele Tshamala
Chinyama Celvin
Hayden Wilson Jnr

References

External links
 Zimbabwe Rugby Union
 Zimbabwe on rugby7.com
 Zimbabwe Seven a Side Rugby
 Zimbabwe is reaping the fruits of their labour in 7s

National rugby sevens teams
Sevens